Karen Aghamyan (born in 1946) is an Armenian painter. He has served as President of the Artists' Union of Armenia since 1998.

Background 
Born in Yerevan in 1946, he has been a member of the Artist’s Union of the USSR since 1970 and president of the Artists' Union of Armenia since 1988.

Career 

Since a young age, Aghamyan has also been influenced by art. He started drawing when he was four years old, and when he was five, Aghamyan attended the Children’s Art Studio. He graduated from Yerevan Fine Arts College in 1969, before becoming the head of the department of design in 1994. Aghamyan later continued to be a professor at the Yerevan Fine Arts and Theatre Institute.

Works 

Aghamyan has taken part in over 70 different art exhibitions, 11 of which were focused solely on him. His pictures are featured at museums in Armenia, Ukraine, Russia, France, and many more in international private collections.

Aghamyan's works are not traditional - they are reserved, even hermetic. He searches, observes and mediates in different, quite unusual systems of expressiveness and the world becomes the object of his emphasized analytic attention. Aghamyan's compositions speak about symbolism and abstract romanticism, expressed under a new light of emotional experience of space. His paintings objects and people are painted gracefully and coolly.

See also 
 Armenian art
 List of Armenian artists
 Culture of Armenia

References

External links
 Karen Aghamyan's biography
  Armenian Artists
 London Art
 Karen Aghamyan
 Russi Net

1946 births
Living people
20th-century Armenian painters
21st-century Armenian painters
Artists from Yerevan